Chakileva is a rural locality (a village) in Stepanovskoye Rural Settlement, Kudymkarsky District, Perm Krai, Russia. The population was 43 as of 2010. There are 7  streets.

Geography 
Chakileva is located 11 km east of Kudymkar (the district's administrative centre) by road. Lopatina is the nearest rural locality.

References 

Rural localities in Kudymkarsky District